Guidon may refer to:

Flags
Guidon (heraldic flag), a type of heraldic flag
Guidon (Commonwealth), a swallow tailed flag for the colours of a light cavalry regiment
Guidon (Portugal), a guião (small square guidon) is carried by each unit of battalion size
Guidon (United States), a military standard

Other
Guidon (rank), a military rank equivalent to ensign
Guidon Club, an anti-woman's suffrage club founded by Helen Kendrick Johnson

People 
Niède Guidon
Giachem Guidon
Anita Moen-Guidon

Publications 
The GUIDON, Official Newspaper of the Ateneo de Manila University

See also
Colours, standards and guidons
Guidon Games